The qualifiers of the 2019 CONCACAF U-17 Championship took place between 16–25 March and 1–7 April 2019. All matches were played at the IMG Academy campus in Bradenton, Florida, United States.

Teams
The 41 CONCACAF teams were ranked based on the CONCACAF Men’s Under-17 Ranking as of May 2017. A total of 35 teams entered the tournament. The highest-ranked 16 entrants were exempt from qualifying and advanced directly to the group stage of the final tournament, while the lowest-ranked 19 entrants had to participate in qualifying.

Draw
The draw for the qualifying round took place on 19 February 2019, 11:00 EST (UTC−5), at the CONCACAF Headquarters in Miami. The 19 teams were drawn into four groups: three groups of five teams and one group of four teams. Based on the CONCACAF Men's Under-17 Ranking, the top four ranked teams were seeded into position one of each group, while the remaining 15 teams were distributed in the other pots, as follows:

Qualifying round
The winners of each group qualify for the 2019 CONCACAF U-17 Championship, where they enter the round of 16 of the knockout stage.

All times are local, EDT (UTC−4).

Group A

Group B

Group C

Group D

Goalscorers

References

External links
Under 17 – Men, CONCACAF.com

Qualifying
U-17 Championship qualifying
2019
March 2019 sports events in the United States
April 2019 sports events in the United States
2019 Concacaf U-17 Championship qualifying
2019 in sports in Florida
2019 in youth association football